Bronów  is a village in the administrative district of Gmina Dobromierz, within Świdnica County, Lower Silesian Voivodeship, in south-western Poland. 

The village has an approximate population of 100.

Gallery

References

Villages in Świdnica County